De'Longhi S.p.A. is an Italian small appliance manufacturer based in Treviso, Italy.

History and trading 
The company was founded by the De'Longhi family in 1902 as a small industrial parts manufacturing workshop. The company incorporated in 1950. Historically a major producer of portable heaters and air conditioners, the company has expanded to include nearly every category of small domestic appliances in the food preparation and cooking, as well as household cleaning and ironing, segments.

Products 
De'Longhi is especially well known for the Artista Series espresso machines, the De'Longhi gelato maker as well as the Pinguino portable air conditioner.

De'Longhi is known for the design of its products. Its Esclusivo line of kitchen appliances won the Red Dot design award in 2007. Home Furnishing News recognized the firm's Design Director Giocomo Borin as one of the 50 most influential designers in the world in 2006.

De'Longhi's 2000 acquisition of Climaveneta SpA and DLRadiators allowed De'Longhi to enter the commercial HVACR (heating, ventilation, air conditioning and refrigeration) market.

Merger and acquisitions 
Its acquisition of the British appliance maker Kenwood for  £45.9 million (about $66.7 million) in 2001 gave it access to Kenwood's Chinese factory. As a result, many of De'Longhi's products are now imported from China, while design and engineering remain largely in Italy.

Acquisition of a majority stake in RC Group, a leading player in datacenter cooling, in 2006 has strengthened its presence in the HVACR market.

In all, the company operates 13 production facilities and 30 international subsidiaries that support sales to 75 countries worldwide. International sales account for nearly 75 percent of the group's total revenues, which topped €1.63 billion in 2010.

On 2 January 2012 the DeLclima group was set up as a demerger from De'Longhi.

On 16 April 2012, De'Longhi bought perpetual rights to manufacture Braun branded products from Procter & Gamble in the small appliance segment. Procter & Gamble will continue to own the Braun brand. €50 million was paid immediately and €90 million will be paid over the next 15 years.

In 2018, India based Orient Electric partnered with De'Longhi to market small kitchen appliances in India.

In November 2020, De'Longhi announced the acquisition of Capital Brands, specialized in mixers for 420 million euros.

Public trading 
Shares in the company are traded on Milan's stock exchange.

In October 2017, the Asthma and Allergy Foundation of America and Allergy Standards Limited announced that five De'Longhi dehumidifiers have earned the Asthma and Allergy Friendly Certification. These are the first dehumidifiers to receive the program's mark.

See also 

 Bialetti
 Cimbali
 Elektra (espresso machines)
 Faema
 FrancisFrancis
 Gaggia
 La Marzocco
 Rancilio
 Saeco

References

External links 
 
 
 Braun Household
 Kenwood

 
Coffee in Italy
Cooking appliance brands
Home appliance brands
Home appliance manufacturers of Italy
Kitchenware brands
Coffee appliance vendors
Espresso machines
Heating, ventilation, and air conditioning companies
Manufacturing companies established in 1902
Italian companies established in 1902
Italian brands
Companies based in Treviso
Multinational companies headquartered in Italy